Sõmeru is a small borough in Lääne-Viru County, in northeastern Estonia. It is located about 4 km east of the town of Rakvere. Sõmeru is the administrative centre of Rakvere Parish. Sõmeru has a population of 1,289 (as of 1 January 2010).

References

External links
Sõmeru Parish 

Boroughs and small boroughs in Estonia